Elections to state legislatures were held on November 4, 2008, alongside other elections, in which Democrats scored significant gains in a blue wave election. Elections were held for 85 legislative chambers, with all states but Louisiana, Mississippi, New Jersey, Alabama, Maryland, and Virginia holding elections in at least one house. Michigan and Minnesota held elections for their lower, but not upper houses. Seven territorial chambers in four territories and the District of Columbia were up. 

The New Hampshire Senate saw the election of the first-ever female majority. This is the first time this has occurred in any chamber of any state legislature in United States history. In New York, the Democrats obtained a trifecta for the first time since 1935.

The Democrats took control of six legislative bodies to the Republicans' four. Democrats took control of the Delaware House of Representatives, for the first time since 1985, the Montana House of Representatives, the Nevada Senate, and the New York State Senate, for the first time since 1966, the Ohio House of Representatives, and the Wisconsin State Assembly. Republicans took control of the Montana Senate; both houses of the Tennessee General Assembly, for the first time since Reconstruction; and the Oklahoma Senate, for the first time in state history.

Summary table
Regularly-scheduled elections were held in 85 of the 99 state legislative chambers in the United States. Nationwide, regularly-scheduled elections were held for 5,948 of the 7,383 legislative seats. Many legislative chambers held elections for all seats, but some legislative chambers that use staggered elections held elections for only a portion of the total seats in the chamber. The chambers not up for election either hold regularly-scheduled elections in odd-numbered years, or have four-year terms and hold all regularly-scheduled elections in presidential midterm election years.

Note that this table only covers regularly-scheduled elections; additional special elections took place concurrently with these regularly-scheduled elections.

Results

State-by-state

Upper houses

Lower houses

Results

Territorial chambers

Upper houses

Lower houses

Unicameral

Notes

References

 
 
State legislative elections
State legislature elections in the United States by year